Moricandia is a genus of tropical air-breathing land snails, terrestrial pulmonate gastropod mollusks in the family Odontostomidae.

Species
 Moricandia angulata (Wagner, 1827)
 Moricandia auriscervina (A. Férussac, 1821)
 Moricandia bouvieri (Dautzenberg, 1896)
 Moricandia dubiosa (Jay, 1839)
 Moricandia nasuta (E. von Martens, 1885)
 Moricandia tolerata (Fulton, 1903)
 Moricandia willi (Dohrn, 1883)
Species brought into synonymy
 Moricandia parallela (L. Pfeiffer, 1857): synonym of Bahiensis occultus (Reeve, 1849) (junior synonym)

References

 Bank, R. A. (2017). Classification of the Recent terrestrial Gastropoda of the World. Last update: July 16th, 2017

External links
 
  Pilsbry, H. A. (1898). Notes on the genus Odontostomus. The Nautilus. 12: 57-58
 Breure, A. S. H. & Araujo, R. (2017). The Neotropical land snails (Mollusca, Gastropoda) collected by the “Comisión Científica del Pacífico.”. PeerJ. 5, e3065

Odontostomidae